Forillon can have the following meanings:

Forillon National Park, a national park in Quebec, Canada
Forillon, original French name of the present Ferryland, Newfoundland and Labrador